Singinkop is a village in Belgaum district of Karnataka, India. Singinkop village is famous for their traditional pottery culture. Here you can get all types of pottery and clay bricks products manufacturers, also have some Tourist places near to the village, like Boothnath Temple, Sidheshwar Temple.

References

Villages in Belagavi district